Darlin', Darlin' is an album released by country musician David Allan Coe, released in 1985 on Columbia Records.

Recording
The album is best remembered for its lead off single, “She Used to Love Me a Lot.”  It was released in December 1984 and peaked at # 11 on both the U.S. Billboard Hot Country Singles chart and the Canadian RPM Country Tracks chart. (A version of the song by Johnny Cash was recorded in the early 1980s, but remained unreleased until 2014.)  The song tells the story of a chance meeting between two ex-lovers at “the Silver Spoon Café,” but when the man tries to rekindle the romance, she dismisses him the in the same cavalier way he did her years earlier. It was written by Dennis Morgan, Charles Quillen, and Kye Fleming, as Coe, who continued to write songs of high quality, nonetheless relied on outside writers to get him in the charts (“The Ride,” “Mona Lisa Lost Her Smile”) as the decade rolled on.

Darlin’, Darlin’ contains mostly cover songs, but Coe’s incredible versatility as an interpretive singer comes to the fore on his renditions of Smokey Robinson’s “My Girl’ (an outtake from the previous album Just Divorced) and J.J. Cale’s “Call Me the Breeze,” although most of the LP is rooted in traditional country.  Like many before him, Coe tries his vocal hand at the standard “My Elusive Dreams,” which was co-written by his producer Billy Sherrill and most famously recorded by David Houston and Tammy Wynette in 1967.  Sherrill’s most famous client, George Jones, performs the recitation on Dean Dillon’s “Don’t Cry Darlin’,” which would be released as a single and peak at #29.  Jones, who at the time of the recording was finally getting sober after a career-long bender, adds authenticity to the story of a man who is “drunk, totally drained, on the verge of going crazy,” and “on the edge of insane.” Coe would join Jones onstage at the inaugural Farm Aid that year, taking a chorus with Jones on his hit "Tennessee Whiskey," which Coe recorded first in 1981.

Uncharacteristically, Coe only contributes two originals to the set, the first being the gospel  "Mary Go Round (About the Birth of Jesus)” and “For Lovers Only,” the fourth and final in a series of songs that appeared on his last three LPs.  Thom Jurek of AllMusic observes, “Musically, this is a big production number - even for Billy Sherrill. There are keyboards winding through everything, big backing vocals, and layered pedal steel and electric guitars.”<ref name=Allmusic>{{cite web |url=https://www.allmusic.com/album/darlin-darlin-mw0000691005 |title=Darlin', Darlin''' – David Allan Coe |author=Thom Jurek |website=Allmusic |accessdate=September 6, 2011}}</ref>

ReceptionDarlin’, Darlin’'' reached  #22 on the country albums chart.  AllMusic: “…as a singer's recording, as odd as some of the material choices are, it works and works well - check Sharon Rice's ‘Too Close to Home’ with keyboard and saxophone solos, but it's Coe's voice that carries the day. This is not the best place for the curious to begin with DAC, but for those who are die-hard fans, this is an essential recording.

Track listing

”She Used to Love Me a Lot” (R.K. Fleming/D. Morgan/C. Quillen)
”You’re the Only Song I Sing Today” (M. Brantley/B. Rabin)
”Too Close to Home” (Sharon Rice)
”My Elusive Dreams” (Curly Putman/Billy Sherrill) 
”Mary Go Round (About the Birth of Jesus)” (David Allan Coe)
”Don’t Cry Darlin’ (with George Jones) (Dean Dillon)
”She Ain’t You”
”My Girl” (Smokey Robinson/Ronald White)
”Call Me the Breeze” (J.J. Cale)
”For Lovers Only” (Coe)

Personnel
Vocals – David Allan Coe
Background vocals: Doug Clements, Hurshel Wiginton, James Ferguson, Lori Westerman Brooks, Louis Nunley, Martha Adcock, Wendy Suits
Steel guitar – Pete Drake
Keyboards – Bobby Wood, Hargus Robbins, Steve Davidowski
Harmonica – Steve McMillan
Guitar – David Allan Coe, Dale Sellers, Billy Sanford, Martha Adcock, Pete Bordonali, Edward Adcock
Drums – Buddy Harmon, Jerry Carrigan, Jerry Kroon
Bass – Harry Strzelecki, Michael Leech
Strings – The “A” Strings
Musician – Ron Reynolds

References

David Allan Coe albums
1985 albums
Albums produced by Billy Sherrill
Columbia Records albums